Beit Meir (lit. House of Meir) is a religious moshav in central Israel. Located in the Jerusalem hills around nine miles from Jerusalem, just off the Jerusalem-Tel Aviv highway, it falls under the jurisdiction of Mateh Yehuda Regional Council.

History
The moshav was established on the land of the depopulated Palestinian village of Bayt Mahsir in 1950, and was named after Rabbi Meir Bar-Ilan.

Landmarks
Hamasrek Nature Reserve
Yeshivat Ohr Yerushalayim, a yeshiva for American post high-school students headed by Rabbi D. Schecter.

References

External links

Hamasrek winery

Moshavim
Populated places established in 1950
Religious Israeli communities
Populated places in Jerusalem District
1950 establishments in Israel
Ashkenazi Jewish culture in Israel
Breslov Hasidim
Sephardi Jewish culture in Israel